Iodobenzene is an organoiodine compound consisting of a benzene ring substituted with one iodine atom. It is useful as a synthetic intermediate in organic chemistry. It is a volatile colorless liquid, although aged samples appear yellowish.

Preparation
Iodobenzene is commercially available, but it can be prepared in the laboratory from aniline via the Diazotization Reaction. In the first step, the amine functional group is diazotized with hydrochloric acid and sodium nitrite. Potassium iodide is added to the resultant phenyldiazonium chloride, causing nitrogen gas to evolve. The product is separated by steam distillation.

Alternatively, it can be produced by refluxing iodine and nitric acid with benzene.

Reactions
Since the C–I bond is weaker than C–Br or C–Cl, iodobenzene is more reactive than bromobenzene or chlorobenzene. Iodobenzene reacts readily with magnesium to form the Grignard reagent, phenylmagnesium iodide. Phenylmagnesium iodide, like the bromide analog, is a synthetic equivalent for the phenyl anion synthon. Iodobenzene reacts with chlorine to give the complex, iodobenzene dichloride, which is used as a solid source of chlorine.

Iodobenzene can also serve as a substrate for the Sonogashira coupling, Heck reaction, and other metal-catalyzed couplings. These reactions proceed via the oxidative addition of iodobenzene.

See also
Fluorobenzene
Chlorobenzene
Bromobenzene

References

Further reading
Gattermann-Wieland, "Laboratory Methods of Organic Chemistry," p. 283. Translated from the twenty-fourth German edition by W. McCartney, The Macmillan Company, New York, 1937.

Iodobenzenes
Phenyl compounds